Mohendra may refer to:
 Mohendra Nath Dutt, poet in English from India, author of Kurukshetra in 1940
 Sri Mohendra Chakraborty, author of the book Sri Sri Ram Thakurer Jeeban Katha, about Ram Thakur
 Mahendra Mohan Choudhry, Chief Minister of Assam, India after Bimala Prasad Chaliha
 Ngangom Mohendra, Member of the Parliament of Manipur, India in 1980 for the Communist Party of India
 Mohendra Ramsarup, Director of Fiscal and Administrative Affairs of the Pratt Center for Community Development, New York City